Fan Yue-tao (born 28 October 1949) is a former Taiwanese cyclist. He competed in the sprint and the 1000m time trial at the 1968 Summer Olympics.

References

External links
 

1949 births
Living people
Taiwanese male cyclists
Olympic cyclists of Taiwan
Cyclists at the 1968 Summer Olympics
Asian Games medalists in cycling
Cyclists at the 1966 Asian Games
Medalists at the 1966 Asian Games
Asian Games bronze medalists for Chinese Taipei